The European Student Moon Orbiter (ESMO) was a proposed European student mission to the Moon. Student teams from 19 universities throughout Europe worked on the program. ESMO was conceived by the Student Space Exploration & Technology Initiative (SSETI) under the support of the European Space Agency (ESA); prior to the start of Phase A the full responsibility for the management of the program was transferred to the ESA Education Office.

In 2009, Surrey Satellite Technology Ltd (SSTL) was selected as prime contractor. In April 2012, ESMO was scheduled for launch in 2014 or 2015, but further ESA evaluation deemed the ESMO project's costs "unsustainable" given the ESA Education Office's budget.

Objectives 
The mission objectives for ESMO were:

 To launch the first lunar spacecraft to be designed, built and operated by students across ESA Member States and ESA Cooperating States
 To place and operate the spacecraft in a lunar orbit
 To acquire images of the Moon from a stable lunar orbit and transmit them back to Earth for education outreach purposes
 To perform new measurements relevant to advanced technology demonstration, lunar science and exploration

The educational aim of the project was to provide valuable hands-on experience to university students within a real and demanding space project. This is in order to fully prepare a well qualified workforce for ambitious future ESA missions.

Lunar transfer 
From there, the spacecraft would use its on-board propulsion to travel to lunar orbit via a weak stability boundary transfer. This travel via the Sun-Earth L1 Lagrange point would take three months, but it requires much less propellant than a direct transfer (see Low energy transfer and Interplanetary Transport Network). ESMO is intended to be operated in lunar orbit for six months.

Payloads 
Payloads that were considered for the orbiter included:

 Narrow Angle Camera (outreach payload): to take images of the lunar surface. High school students will be able to propose a lunar site to be imaged.
 LunaNet (technology demonstration payload): internet-like network at the Moon for communication between future spacecraft in lunar orbit, landers, rovers and ground stations on the Earth. The LunaNet experiment will test the associated communication protocols for the Lunar Internet.
 Radiation Monitor (scientific payload): a compact and low power radiation monitor which can provide inputs for Space environment models.
 Radar (scientific payload): to provide radar observations of the Moon (radar observations from Earth are limited to the Earth-facing side of the Moon).
 Microwave Radiometric Sounder (scientific payload): a passive Microwave radiometer to measure thermal and dielectric properties of the lunar regolith.

Technical facts 
The table below provides an overview of the spacecraft platform and the ground segment.

Current teams 
Twenty-one teams from 19 European universities in ESA member states and cooperating states were part of the project.

Led by ESA's Education Office at ESTEC, the project successfully completed a Phase A feasibility study and continued with the preliminary design during phase B. So far, more than 200 students have been involved in phases A and B of the ESMO project. Since November 2009, SSTL coordinate and supervise the work of the students, providing system-level and specialist technical support. Regular workshops at ESTEC and ESOC as well as internships at SSTL were organized to support the student teams in their ESMO related activities and provide training / knowledge transfer. Additionally, facilities at SSTL will be utilized for spacecraft assembly, integration and testing. As a major milestone during phase B, the System Requirements Review (SRR) for ESMO was performed in 2010. At SRR, the system requirements and system design were finalised. Part of the SRR also selected the university teams to participate in the following phases of the project. After passing a preliminary design review in March 2012, the program was ended as a result of budget constraints in April 2012. ESMO was to have been the fourth mission within ESA's Education Satellite Programme following SSETI Express, YES2 and the European Student Earth Orbiter (ESEO).

References

External links 
 ESMO Homepage of the ESA Education Office
 SSTL Homepage - Lunar and Interplanetary Projects

Cancelled spacecraft
Space organizations